Seaton Meadows is an  biological Site of Special Scientific Interest east of Seaton in Rutland. It is owned and managed by Plantlife.

This site is traditionally managed as hay pasture, and it is an example of unimproved alluvial flood meadows, a rare habitat due to agricultural developments. The grasses are diverse, including meadow foxtail, red fescue, sweet vernal grass and Yorkshire fog.

There is access from the B672 road.

References

Sites of Special Scientific Interest in Rutland